Prairie City School is a public school in Prairie City, Oregon, United States that serves students from kindergarten through twelfth grade. It is the only school in the Prairie City School District.

Academics
In 2008, 73% of the school's seniors received a high school diploma. Of 11 students, eight graduated, none dropped out, one received a modified diploma, and two were still in high school the following year.

References

Public middle schools in Oregon
High schools in Grant County, Oregon
Education in Grant County, Oregon
Public high schools in Oregon
Public elementary schools in Oregon